Cinders is an American silent drama film.

Production
The dog in the film was played by 'Mutt,' cast member George Stanley's own dog.

Release
Cinders was released on May 2, 1913, in the United States, and on August 14, 1913, in England. It accompanied the two-reel prestige drama, Hearts of the First Empire at screenings in New Zealand in March, 1914.

References

External links
 

1913 films
1913 drama films
Silent American drama films
American black-and-white films
American silent short films
Films directed by Rollin S. Sturgeon
1910s American films